Charles Adams (May 29, 1770 – November 30, 1800) was the second son of the second President John Adams and his wife, Abigail Adams (née Smith). He was also the younger brother of the sixth President John Quincy Adams.

Biography
As a child, smallpox had broken out killing many. He and his family got inoculated for the disease. He and his younger brother Thomas were not showing symptoms, so they both had the procedure done a few more times. His mother, Abigail Adams, and brothers Thomas and John Quincy had mild symptoms, but he and his sister Nabby were both very sick, though both recovered within weeks. 

At the age of nine, he traveled with his father and older brother, John Quincy, to Europe, studying in Passy, Amsterdam, and Leiden. He matriculated in Leiden on January 29, 1781.
In December 1781, 11 year old Charles returned to America unaccompanied by family members. He had been feeling homesick and returned. In 1784, Abigail and Nabby moved to England to live with John Adams, who was working there at the time. John Quincy would join them later.

While attending Harvard College starting in 1785, the 15 year old Charles got into a lot of trouble, though his most famous act was running naked through Harvard Yard while drunk along with a group of friends. He almost got kicked out, which was the first recorded case of Primal Scream. John Quincy and Thomas would later attend Harvard soon after Charles.

After graduating from Harvard College in 1789, he moved to New York City, where plans had been made for him to work in the legal office of Alexander Hamilton. Hamilton was named Secretary of the Treasury and Adams moved to the law office of John Laurance to continue his studies. Adams passed the bar examination in 1792.

On August 29, 1795, Adams married Sarah "Sally" Smith (1769–1828), the sister of his brother-in-law, William Stephens Smith.  They had two daughters, Susanna Boylston (1796–1884) and Abigail Louisa Smith (1798–1836).  Abigail married the banker and philosopher Alexander Bryan Johnson and their son, Alexander Smith Johnson, became a judge. At the age of 37, Abigail Louisa died of uterine cancer.

Adams was an alcoholic who engaged in extramarital relationships and made questionable financial decisions. He was disowned by his father and sometimes lived apart from his family.

Death
It is a common myth that Adams died on November 30, 1800 of cirrhosis, a disease often caused by alcoholism.  In a letter from Abigail to John Quincy after his death she stated Adams died in New York City of "dropsy of the chest" or pleurisy.  Pleurisy can be caused by a multitude of respiratory diseases, such as tuberculosis, pneumonia, and even cancer.  He was the first child of a president to die while the president was in office. He was 30 years old.

Depictions in popular culture 
In 2008, HBO presented the miniseries entitled John Adams based on the book by David McCullough. The biographical presentation depicts President John Adams as a neglectful father to Charles Adams, and suggests that the elder Adams' failures as a father negatively influenced Charles' development. Historians have pointed out the inaccuracies of the series' representation of their relationship.

References

External links 
 The Adams Family
 Charles Adams

1770 births
1800 deaths
Adams political family
Children of presidents of the United States
Children of vice presidents of the United States
Harvard College alumni
People from Quincy, Massachusetts
18th-century American lawyers
Deaths from pleurisy
Leiden University alumni
Children of John Adams